Ben Grant may refer to:

 Ben Grant (film producer), Australian film producer
 Ben Grant (rugby union) (born 1998), Australian rugby union player
 Ben Z. Grant (born 1939), Texas state legislator and judge
 Benjamin Grant (born 1970), Sierra Leonean sprinter

See also
 Benny Grant (1908–1991), Canadian ice hockey goalie